Alanqa is a genus of pterodactyloid pterosaur from the Late Cretaceous period (Cenomanian stage) of what is now the Kem Kem Beds of southeastern Morocco. The name Alanqa comes from the Arabic word العنقاء al-‘Anqā’, for a mythical bird of Arabian culture.

Discovery
Aided by local villagers, a team of paleontologists had been excavating at several locations in the Kem Kem Beds during April, and November to December 2008, uncovering remains of several different pterosaurs.

Description
 
Alanqa is known only from five fragments of the front upper and lower jaws, and possibly a neck vertebra, representing the single type species Alanqa saharica. Two of these fragments were first described, but not named, by Wellnhofer and Buffetaut in 1999, and referred to a pteranodontid. Three additional jaw specimens, including a better preserved upper jaw, were described and named by Ibrahim and colleagues in 2010. The jaws were straight and pointed, like those of the azhdarchids Quetzalcoatlus and Zhejiangopterus. Based on comparison to related species, the Alanqa saharica the individuals known from jaw specimens probably had wingspans of about 4 meters (13 ft). However, according to Ibrahim and colleagues, the vertebra (which probably belonged to the same species) appeared to come from a larger individual, measuring about 6 meters (20 ft) in wingspan. In 2022, Gregory S. Paul agreed with Ibrahim et al.

A rostrum fragment was described in 2015 and referred to cf. Alanqa based on provenance. This fragment has two bony protuberances where the jaw occludes, coinciding with an eminence on one of the mandibles originally referred to Alanqa. These imply an unusual functional specialization in this pterosaur; possible functions include visual display, anchoring of soft tissue, and crushing hard-shelled food. However, this specimen probably belongs to Xericeps, based on shared features with this taxon.

Classification
In its initial description, Alanqa was referred to the Azhdarchidae, based on the similarity of its jaws to those of Quetzalcoatlus and Zhejiangopterus. This result was reproduced by a subsequent analysis. Another analysis, this time by Nicholas Longrich and colleagues in 2018, recovered Alanqa as a thalassodromid, sister taxon to Aerotitan (a pterosaur also assigned as an azhdarchid). However, this concept is not well-supported. The cladogram of their analysis is shown below:

A 2022 study by Rodrigo Pêgas and colleagues showed dissimilarities between Aerotitan and Alanqa, as well as other thalassodromines. The former was recovered as an azhdarchid, while Alanqa was recovered as a basal azhdarchoid related to Keresdrakon, both forming the new clade Alanqidae.

Paleoecology 
Alanqa was recovered from the Kem Kem Group of the late Cenomanian period, then a freshwater delta system. It is believed to have been in the middle of the ecosystem's food web, preying on both small animals like crustaceans and mollusks, amphibians like Kababisha and Oumtkoutia, small to medium-sized reptiles like Simoliophis libycus and Jeddaherdan aleadonta, and even small or juvenile dinosaurs, much like other azhdarchids. On the other hand, Alanqa would be a prey item for the large predators of the ecosystem, such as theropod dinosaurs, (Spinosaurus, Carcharodontosaurus, and Sauroniops), and reptiles like Aegisuchus, and an unidentified Madtsoiid snake.

See also
 Timeline of pterosaur research
 List of pterosaurs
 2010 in paleontology

References

Late Cretaceous pterosaurs of Africa
Azhdarchoids
Fossil taxa described in 2010
Cenomanian genera